Jean-Paul Dufrègne (born 28 March 1958) is a French politician representing the French Communist Party. He was  French National Assembly deputy from 18 June 2017 to 19 June 2022, representing the department of Allier.

See also
 2017 French legislative election
 2022 French legislative election

References

Living people
Deputies of the 15th National Assembly of the French Fifth Republic
French Communist Party politicians
Place of birth missing (living people)
1958 births